Fufius is a genus of Central and South American Rhytidicolidae that was first described by Eugène Simon in 1888. Originally placed with the curtain web spiders, it was moved to the Cyrtaucheniidae in 1941 and to Rhytidicolidae in 2022.

Species
 it contains thirteen species:
Fufius albovittatus (Simon, 1891) – Brazil
Fufius annulipes (Mello-Leitão, 1941) – Colombia
Fufius antillensis (F. O. Pickard-Cambridge, 1899) – Trinidad
Fufius atramentarius Simon, 1888 (type) – Central America
Fufius auricomus (Simon, 1891) – Brazil
Fufius candango Ortega, Nagahama, Motta & Bertani, 2013 – Brazil
Fufius ecuadorensis (Simon, 1892) – Ecuador
Fufius funebris Vellard, 1924 – Brazil
Fufius jalapensis Ortega, Nagahama, Motta & Bertani, 2013 – Brazil
Fufius lanicius (Simon, 1892) – Bolivia
Fufius lucasae Guadanucci & Indicatti, 2004 – Brazil
Fufius minusculus Ortega, Nagahama, Motta & Bertani, 2013 – Brazil
Fufius striatipes (Drolshagen & Bäckstam, 2009) – Brazil

References

Cyrtaucheniidae
Mygalomorphae genera
Taxa named by Eugène Simon